This article includes a list of U.S. states that have highest portion of savings (i.e. pensions, investment products, 401(k)); regular savings account, certificate of deposit, or Individual Retirement Account. The increase in people has also increased the Nest Egg index within a given year.

External links 
 Nest Egg Index by state @ StateMaster.com
 A.G. Edwards 2007 Nest Egg Index Ranking by State @ HR.BLR.com

Savings rate